LIG Nex1 Co., Ltd. (formerly known as NEX1 Future and LG Innotek) is a South Korean aerospace manufacturer and defense company. It was established in 1976 as Goldstar Precision. LIG Nex1 was previously owned by LIG Holdings Company, which in turn was owned by the LIG Group. In 2013, a consortium led by South Korea private equity firm STIC Investments acquired 49 percent stake in LIG Nex1 for 420 billion Korean won.
 
It develops and produces a wide range of advanced precision electronic systems, including missile, underwater weapon systems, radars, electronic warfare, avionics, tactical communication systems, fire control systems, naval combat systems, and electro-optics. It is one of the major suppliers of weapon systems for the Republic of Korea Armed Forces, as well as an international exporter of weapon systems.

Products

Missiles 
 Chiron
 Haeseong (C-Star)
 KM-SAM
 K-SAAM
 Raybolt

Torpedoes 
 Red Shark
 Blue Shark
 White Shark

References

External links 
 Official website 

Aerospace companies of South Korea
Defence companies of South Korea
Manufacturing companies established in 1969
Technology companies established in 1969